German submarine U-465 was a Type VIIC U-boat of Nazi Germany's Kriegsmarine during World War II.

She carried out four patrols. She sank no ships.

She was a member of four wolfpacks.

She was sunk by an Australian aircraft in the Bay of Biscay on 2 May 1943.

Design
German Type VIIC submarines were preceded by the shorter Type VIIB submarines. U-465 had a displacement of  when at the surface and  while submerged. She had two shafts and two  propellers.

U-465 was fitted with five  torpedo tubes (four fitted at the bow and one at the stern), fourteen torpedoes, one  SK C/35 naval gun, 220 rounds, and one twin  C/30 anti-aircraft gun. The boat had a complement of between forty-four and sixty.

Service history
The submarine was laid down on 17 May 1941 at Deutsche Werke in Kiel as yard number 296, launched on 30 March 1942 and commissioned on 20 May under the command of Kapitänleutnant Heinz Wolf.

She served with the 8th U-boat Flotilla from 20 May 1942 for training and the 7th flotilla from 1 October for operations.

First patrol
U-432s first patrol was preceded by a short journey from Kiel in Germany to Arendal (northeast of Kristiansand) in Norway. The patrol itself began when the boat departed Arendal on 16 November 1942. She passed through the gap separating Iceland and the Faroe Islands and headed for Newfoundland. She arrived at St. Nazaire in occupied France on 21 December.

Second patrol
The U-boat was attacked by an Allied aircraft in mid-Atlantic on 6 February 1943. The damage sustained was serious enough to force the abandonment of her patrol.

Third patrol
The boat's third foray was relatively uneventful.

Fourth patrol and loss
She was attacked and sunk in the Bay of Biscay by an Australian Sunderland flying boat of No. 461 Squadron RAAF on 2 May 1943.

Forty-eight men went down with U-465; there were no survivors.

Wolfpacks
U-465 took part in four wolfpacks, namely:
 Panzer (23 November – 11 December 1942) 
 Raufbold (11 – 12 December 1942) 
 Landsknecht (19 – 28 January 1943) 
 Pfeil (1 – 8 February 1943)

Previously recorded fate
Sunk on 7 May 1943 in the Bay of Biscay by depth charges from an Australian Sunderland flying boat of No. 10 Squadron RAAF.

References

Bibliography

External links

German Type VIIC submarines
U-boats commissioned in 1942
U-boats sunk in 1943
U-boats sunk by depth charges
U-boats sunk by Australian aircraft
1942 ships
Ships built in Kiel
Ships lost with all hands
World War II submarines of Germany
Maritime incidents in May 1943